The Santa Barbara News-Press is a broadsheet newspaper based in Santa Barbara, California.

History

The oldest predecessor (the weekly Santa Barbara Post) of the News-Press started publishing on May 30, 1868.

The Santa Barbara Post became the Santa Barbara Press, which eventually became the Morning Press which was acquired in 1932 by Thomas M. Storke and merged with his paper, the Santa Barbara News, to make the Santa Barbara News-Press. Storke, a prominent local rancher and booster descended from the Spanish founders of Santa Barbara, brought the paper to prominence. For many years his father, Charles A. Storke, ran the editorial page; his son, Charles A. Storke II, oversaw operations between 1932 and 1960.  In 1962, T. M. Storke won the Pulitzer Prize for Editorial Writing "for his forceful editorials calling public attention to the activities of a semi-secret organization known as the John Birch Society". His children did not express interest in continuing to run the paper, however.

Storke then sold the paper in 1964 to Robert McClean, owner of the Philadelphia Bulletin, who turned over publishing of the News-Press to one of his nephews, Stuart S. Taylor, father of writer Stuart Taylor, Jr.  (The Philadelphia Bulletin continued to be run by another nephew of Robert McLean.) Under Stuart S. Taylor's tutelage news writers flourished, including Dick Smith, Walker Tompkins, and others. The nearby Dick Smith Wilderness Area was named for Dick, a noted environmentalist. Larry Pidgeon was a well-known editorial writer for the paper. The paper was sold to The New York Times in 1984.  In 2000 the paper was bought by Wendy P. McCaw, an ex-wife of billionaire Craig McCaw.

Controversy

In early summer 2006, six editors and a long-time columnist suddenly resigned. The group cited the imposition of McCaw and her managers' personal opinions onto the process of reporting and publishing the news; McCaw expressed the view that the News-Press newsroom staff had become sloppy and biased. Tensions had existed between McCaw and the newsroom since she bought the News-Press in 2000.

Between July 2006 and February 2007, 60 staff (out of 200 total employees), including all but 2 news reporters, resigned or were fired from the News-Press.  Newsroom employees voted to unionize with the Teamsters, and both the News-Press management and the Teamsters made multiple appeals to the National Labor Relations Board.  Former employees have encouraged subscribers to cancel their subscriptions to the News-Press, and have encouraged advertisers to cease advertising in the paper.  McCaw's attorneys have filed lawsuits against former employees, journalists, as well as competing newspapers, and have issued numerous cease and desist letters, to websites linking to the News-Press website, to local business that display signs in support of former employees, and to former employees who speak to the local media.

The parent company of the News-Press, Ampersand Publishing, filed a copyright infringement suit on November 9, 2006, against the Santa Barbara Independent ("SBI")—where many former News-Press columnists had become contributors to the community weekly—claiming that a link on independent.com violated copyright law. The case never reached trial, as an undisclosed settlement was reached on April 28, 2008, resulting in a dismissal at the request of the parties.

See also
 Santa Barbara Independent
 Santa Barbara Daily Sound
 History of Santa Barbara, California
 Labor relations at the Santa Barbara News-Press

Notes

External links
 
 Thomas M. Storke at the California Newspaper Association Hall of Fame
 Charles A. Storke at the California Newspaper Association Hall of Fame

Controversy

 Save the Santa Barbara News-Press, site critical of the News-Press

Daily newspapers published in California
Santa Barbara, California
1868 establishments in California
Newspapers established in 1868